Bryce Christopher Young (born July 25, 2001) is an American football quarterback for the Alabama Crimson Tide. He holds the record for most passing yards in a single game by an Alabama quarterback (559) and was the recipient of several awards in 2021, including the Heisman Trophy.

Early life
Young was born in Philadelphia, Pennsylvania, on July 25, 2001. He later moved to Pasadena, California, where he lived for most of his adolescence.

High school career
Young attended Cathedral High School in Los Angeles and transferred to Mater Dei High School in Santa Ana, California, for his last two years of high school football. As a senior, he was the Los Angeles Times Player of the Year and California's Gatorade Football Player of the Year after throwing for 4,528 yards and 58 touchdowns. He was also the USA Today High School Offensive Player of the Year. During his high school career he passed for 13,520 yards and 152 touchdowns and was a five star recruit ranked the nations #1 quarterback prospect and second overall recruit. After originally committing to the University of Southern California (USC) to play football, Young decommitted and decided instead to play at the University of Alabama for Nick Saban.

College career

Freshman year

During his freshman year at Alabama, Young was the backup to junior quarterback Mac Jones throughout the 2020 season. On September 26, 2020, Young made his collegiate debut in the late third quarter against Missouri at Faurot Field. That night, Young went 5-of-8 for 54 passing yards with two rushing yards on four attempts. Young appeared in a total of nine games in 2020, finishing the season with 156 passing yards and one touchdown. He also appeared in the final play of the 2021 CFP National Championship, taking a knee with about 15 seconds left to seal Alabama's 52–24 victory over Ohio State.

Sophomore year
On September 4, 2021, Young made his debut as the Crimson Tide's starting quarterback. In a 44–13 win over No. 14 Miami (Florida), he passed for 344 yards and four touchdowns.

On November 20, 2021, against Arkansas, Young threw for 559 yards to break the Alabama school record for passing yards in a game. The previous record was held by Scott Hunter.

Young won the Heisman Trophy following the end of the 2021 season, becoming the first Alabama quarterback to win the award.

Junior year 
In his junior year, Young led the Crimson Tide to an 11–2 record, including a 45–20 victory over No. 14 Kansas State in the 2022 Sugar Bowl. On January 2, 2023, Young announced that he would forgo his senior season and enter the 2023 NFL Draft.

Statistics

References

External links

 
 
 Alabama Crimson Tide profile

2001 births
Living people
African-American players of American football
Alabama Crimson Tide football players
All-American college football players
American football quarterbacks
Christians from California
Heisman Trophy winners
Players of American football from Los Angeles
Players of American football from Philadelphia
Sportspeople from Santa Ana, California